Michael Sarver is the self-titled solo debut studio album by American Idol finalist and singer-songwriter Michael Sarver. It was released on July 27, 2010 under Dream Records/Fontana Distribution.

Track listing

Personnel
Michael Sarver – Vocals
Background Vocals
Perry Coleman
Rachel Thibodeau
Tyler Logan
Joel Bodker
Tate Huff
Zach Logan
Musicians
Kenny Greenburg – Guitar
Adam Shoenfeld – Guitar
Tom Bukovac – Guitar
Nick Buda – Drums
Shannon Forrest – Drums
Ilya Toshinsky – Acoustic Guitar
Mark Hill – Bass
Gordon Mote – Piano
Mike Rojas – Keyboards

Chart performance

References

2010 debut albums
Michael Sarver albums